Greece participated in the Eurovision Song Contest 1991 in Rome. Sophia Vossou represented Greece with the song "I anixi".

Before Eurovision

Ellinikós Telikós 1991 
The final took place on 29 March 1991 at the ERT TV Studios in Athens and was hosted by Dafni Bokota. The songs were presented as video clips and the winning song was chosen by a panel of "experts".

At Eurovision
Greece scored 36 points, placing 13th.

Voting

References

1991
Countries in the Eurovision Song Contest 1991
Eurovision